Leanne Krueger is an American politician from Pennsylvania currently serving as a Democratic member for the Pennsylvania House of Representative, District 161 since 2015.

Early life and education
Krueger received her bachelor's degree from Rutgers University and a master's degree in business administration from Eastern University. She served as the executive director of the Sustainable Business Network of Greater Philadelphia between 2004 and 2013, where she worked with local businesses to promote their growth and environmentally conscious business practices. Krueger went on to work as the senior director for strategy and development for the Business Alliance for Local Living Economies (BALLE) in 2013.

Political career
Krueger ran for the Pennsylvania House of Representatives seat in the 161st district in the 2014 elections, losing to incumbent Joe Hackett of the Republican Party.

Hackett resigned in 2015 and Krueger won the special election to fill the remainder of his term in August 2015. She was sworn in on August 25. She was reelected in 2016 and in 2018. Krueger currently sits on the Appropriations, Environmental Resources & Energy, and Labor & Industry committees.

Personal life
Krueger is divorced. She lives in Wallingford, Pennsylvania, with her son, Wendell.

References

External links

 Official Website

Living people
People from Delaware County, Pennsylvania
Rutgers University alumni
Eastern University (United States) alumni
Year of birth missing (living people)
Place of birth missing (living people)
Democratic Party members of the Pennsylvania House of Representatives

21st-century American women politicians
Women state legislators in Pennsylvania